Iuzzolino is an Italian surname. Notable people with the surname include:

Mike Iuzzolino (born 1968), American basketball player and coach
Walter Iuzzolino (born 1968), Italian television producer

Italian-language surnames